Beep Prepared is a 1961 Warner Brothers Merrie Melodies American theatrical cartoon short directed by Chuck Jones and designer Maurice Noble. The short was released on November 11, 1961, and stars Wile E. Coyote and the Road Runner. The title is a play on the Boy Scouts of America motto "Be Prepared".

Plot 
While getting ready to chase the roadrunner, Wile E. is startled by the Roadrunner's Beep Beep and falls backward off a cliff; he remains suspended in space until the roadrunner fires a starter pistol in the air; Wile E. falls to the canyon floor.After being run off the edge of the cliff, Wile E. Coyote begins his typical plotting of various methods to catch the bird. First, Wile E. tries to trip the Road Runner with his own foot, only to have it flattened by a passing delivery truck. Taking higher ground, Wile E. uses a bow and arrow to skewer the Road Runner, only to have the bow hit him in the nose instead (he ends up being flattened by two rocks). He tries to trap the Road Runner in a manhole, which the Road Runner uses as a portable hole (Wile E. falls through a bridge to a riverbank). Other traps include a rocket-powered flying suit (which explodes), a box of "ACME Iron Bird Seed" and a big magnet (which pulls him into the path of a train), a spring-loaded block of pavement (which ends up crushing him), a pair of machine guns connected by a trip wire (which the Roadrunner cuts; Wile E gets blasted by bullets), and an ACME Rocket-Sled Kit (which blasts off too early; Wile E goes off into space and explodes and turns into a giant firework in the sky of himself about to fire a arrow).

Awards
The film was nominated for an Academy Award for Best Animated Short Film, being the only Coyote/Road Runner short to receive this.

Crew
Co-Director & Layouts: Maurice Noble
Animation: Bob Bransford, Tom Ray, Ken Harris & Richard Thompson
Backgrounds: Philip DeGuard
Effects Animation: Harry Love
Film Editor: Treg Brown
Music: Milt Franklyn
Produced by David H. DePatie & John W. Burton
Story by John Dunn & Chuck Jones
Directed by Chuck Jones

References

External links
 
 

1961 short films
Merrie Melodies short films
Warner Bros. Cartoons animated short films
1961 animated films
Short films directed by Chuck Jones
Wile E. Coyote and the Road Runner films
Films scored by Milt Franklyn
Films directed by Maurice Noble
1960s Warner Bros. animated short films
Animated films without speech
American animated short films
Films about Canis
Animated films about mammals
Animated films about birds